Panic: The Story of Modern Financial Insanity is a non-fiction book by Michael Lewis about the most important and severe upheavals in past financial history. The book was published on November 2, 2009 by W. W. Norton & Company. The text, Lewis writes, is an effort "to recreate the more recent financial panics, in an attempt to show how financial markets now operate."

Reception

—Review by The Guardian

References

External links
Book profile on books.wwnorton.com

Finance books
2009 non-fiction books
Business books
W. W. Norton & Company books
Books by Michael Lewis